Walery Brochocki (15 December 1847, Włocławek -  13 October 1923, Warsaw) was a Polish landscape painter.

Biography 
His father died when he was ten and his family placed him in the Cadet School in Moscow. In 1866, after serving for only a short time in the Russian Army, he resigned and enrolled at a private drawing school in Warsaw, under the direction of Chrystian Breslauer.

In 1869, he transferred to the Academy of Fine Arts, Munich, where he studied with Adolf Heinrich Lier and Hermann Anschütz and first began specializing in landscapes.

He first exhibited at various salons in Munich. At the 1873 Vienna World's Fair, he received a silver medal for his painting of a Gypsy camp. He moved to Paris in 1877, where he devoted himself to painting landscapes and cityscapes. During this time, he came under the influence of Charles-François Daubigny. The following year, he received a commission from the French Colonial Society to go to Algiers, where he created a large panorama of the city.

In 1888, he returned to Poland and settled in Warsaw; although he travelled extensively, visiting Podole, Bessarabia and Lithuania.

During his last years, he was a member of the progressive artists' group, . He is interred at Powązki Cemetery.

References

External links

 More works by Brochocki @ Artnet

1847 births
1923 deaths
Polish painters
Polish male painters
Polish landscape painters
People from Włocławek